Avèze is the name of two communes in France:

 Avèze, Gard, in the Gard department
 Avèze, Puy-de-Dôme, in the Puy-de-Dôme department

See also 
 Avezé